Kermia felina is a species of sea snail, a marine gastropod mollusc in the family Raphitomidae.

Description
The length of the shell varies between 5 mm and 10 mm.

The shell is decussated by longitudinal and revolving sculpture. It is yellowish white, with chestnut short longitudinal strigations upon the granules, often upon every alternate rib, interrupted by a central white space, and again painted towards the base. Sometimes this
coloring is broken up and more or less dispersed over the surface.

Distribution
This species occurs off Taiwan, Samoa and Queensland, Australia.

References

 Reeve, L.A. 1843. Monograph of the genus Pleurotoma. pls 1–18 in Reeve, L.A. (ed.). Conchologica Iconica. London : L. Reeve & Co. Vol. 1. 
 Kuroda, T. & Habe, T. 1952. Checklist and bibliography of the Recent Mollusca of Japan. Tokyo : Leo W. Stach 210 pp.
 Powell, A.W.B. 1966. The molluscan families Speightiidae and Turridae, an evaluation of the valid taxa, both Recent and fossil, with list of characteristic species. Bulletin of the Auckland Institute and Museum. Auckland, New Zealand 5: 1–184, pls 1–23
 Cernohorsky, W.O. (1978a) Tropical Pacific Marine Shells. Pacific Publications, Sydney and New York, 352 pp. page(s): 161, pl. 57 fig. 12

External links
 
 Gastropods.com: Kermia felina

felina
Gastropods described in 1843